Paqtnkek Mi’kmaw Nation (pronounced buck-n-keg) is a Mi'kmaq Band in northeastern Nova Scotia. Its populated reserve is Paqtnkek-Niktuek 23. As of December 2019 the total registered population was 598. It is a member of the Confederacy of Mainland Mi'kmaq. The name Paqtnkek means “by the bay” or "Above the water (but at a distance from the ocean)". The area has long been important to Mi'kmaq for the fishing of eel and other species.

Bayside Travel Centre
The lands of the First Nation were divided in 1960 with the building of the Trans-Canada Highway, making access to some parts difficult. In 2017 an agreement was reached with federal and provincial governments to build a new interchange, which opened in 2019. The band's business arm, Bayside Development Corporation Limited was incorporated in 2018 and its shares are held in trust for the benefit of Paqtnkek. It operates Bayside Travel Centre at exit 36-B on Nova Scotia Highway 104 which includes fuel service, convenience store, restaurants, a Nova Scotia Liquor Corporation agency store, entertainment centre and a visitor information centre with cultural displays. It opened in October 2019.

Reserves
Paq'tnkek First Nation has three reserves:

See also
List of Indian Reserves in Nova Scotia
List of Indian Reserves in Canada

References

External links
 Paq'tnkek First Nation website
 Bayside Development Corporation, the business arm of Paqtnkek Mi’kmaw Nation

Further reading
 The Epic Fight Over the Enigmatic Eel
 Ethnogenesis or Cultural Interference? Catholic Missionaries and the Micmac - Christian Kauder's work for the band in the 1850s and 60s.
  Customary Food, Feasting and Legal Identities at Paq’tnkek First Nation - A Bachelor's thesis

First Nations governments in Atlantic Canada
First Nations in Nova Scotia
Mi'kmaq governments
Communities in Antigonish County, Nova Scotia